Piloty is a surname:

 Karl von Piloty (1826–1886), German painter
 Ferdinand Piloty (der Ältere, 1786–1844), German lithographer
 Ferdinand von Piloty (der Jüngere) (1828–1895), German painter and illustrator
 Oskar Piloty (1866–1915), German chemist
 Robert Piloty (1924-2013), Computer scientist